The Eurotunnel Class 0001 Bo-Bo diesel-electric locomotives were built by Maschinenbau Kiel (manufacturers designation DE 1004) between 1991 and 1992. They are very similar to the NS Class 6400. When operating in the United Kingdom, the locomotives are assigned a TOPS classification as Class 21.

History and design
Five locomotives were built, numbered 0001–0005. They carry a yellow and grey livery and are used by Getlink for rescuing trains in the Channel Tunnel, and for propelling service trains in the channel tunnel. They are cleared to travel to Calais, Ashford, or St. Pancras; since 2007 they have been authorised to rescue trains on High Speed 1 in the event of a power failure. They have also been used to haul the SNCF TGV Iris 320 test train through the Channel Tunnel.

In 2007 the locomotives were fitted with diesel particulate filters for the exhaust gases, which replaced the exhaust scrubber wagons that were previously coupled to the engines.

Following a series of tunnel breakdowns due to snow during winter 2009/10, during which the locomotives were extensively used, in November 2010 Eurotunnel announced it was to acquire two more "Krupp rescue locomotives" with co-financing from Eurostar, at a cost of €1.3 million. The locomotives acquired were similar NS 6400 locomotives bought second hand from DB Schenker Nederland, which were renumbered as 0006-0007. Eurotunnel acquired a further three in September 2016. One of these three will be retained as a shunter to work at the goods yard at Calais-Fréthun, and has received the silver and blue Europorte livery, while the other two have the grey and yellow Eurotunnel livery identical to the remainder of the fleet.

Notes

References

External links
Images

, maintenance at the former NedTrain workshops in Tilburg

0001
Bo-Bo locomotives
MaK locomotives
Channel Tunnel
Railway locomotives introduced in 1992
Standard gauge locomotives of Great Britain
Standard gauge locomotives of France
Diesel-electric locomotives of France
Diesel-electric locomotives of Great Britain